Alive (in concert) is a live album by Belgian artist Axelle Red. It was released in 2000.

Track listing

Charts

Certifications

References

Axelle Red albums
2000 live albums
Virgin Records live albums